Pishin (also Romanized as Pīshīn) is a city in and the capital of Pishin District, in Sarbaz County, Sistan and Baluchestan Province, Iran. At the 2006 census, its population was 10,477, in 1,832 families.

Pishin has an altitude of 219 metres (721 feet). It is near the Pakistani border, across which is the town of Mand to the east.  The Iranian government has set up a customs post to develop border trade between Iran and Pakistan.  The overwhelming majority of the city's inhabitants are ethnic Baloch who speak the Balochi language.

It was the site of the 2009 Pishin bombing.

Dam
The largest dam in Sistan and Baluchistan province has been built south of Pishin to provide water for agriculture and human consumption in Pishin and Bahu districts.

References

Cities in Sistan and Baluchestan Province
Iran–Pakistan border crossings
Populated places in Sarbaz County